Farina is a surname. It means flour in several Romance languages.

Italian surname "Farina"

Farina is the Italian word for "flour."

Notable people with the surname include:
 Adele Farina, Australian politician
 Amy Farina, American musician
 Antonio Farina (fl. 1670s) Italian composer
 Battista "Pinin" Farina (later Battista Pininfarina), Italian automobile stylist
 Carlo Farina, Italian composer and violinist of the Baroque era
 Carolyn Farina, American actress
 Dennis Farina (1944–2013), American actor
 Frank Farina, Australian football player and former manager of the Socceroos
 Gianluca Farina, Italian competition rower and Olympic champion
 Giovanni Antonio Farina, Italian bishop
 Giuseppe Farina, Italian Grand Prix racer and first Formula One World Drivers Champion
 Giuseppe La Farina, leader of the Italian Risorgimento
 Johann Maria Farina (1685–1766), the creator of Eau de Cologne
 Mark Farina, American house music DJ and producer
 Piergiorgio Farina (1933–2008), Italian jazz violinist
 Pietro Farina (1942–2013), Italian Roman Catholic bishop
 Raffaele Farina, Italian cardinal of the Roman Catholic Church
 Robin Farina (born 1977), American cyclist
 Salvatore Farina, Italian novelist
 Santo and Johnny Farina, an American rock 'n' roll duo
 Sergio Farina (later Sergio Pininfarina), Italian car designer, son of Battista Farina
 Simone Farina, Italian footballer
 Stefano Farina, Italian football referee
 William Farina, American essayist and author 
 Farina brothers, wealthy Neapolitan lawyers who may have sponsored the castrato Carlo Broschi, whose stage-name, “Farinelli”, may be a homage to them.

Spanish surname "Fariña"

The Spanish equivalent is Fariña:

 Leonardo Fariña, Argentine citizen
 Mimi Baez Fariña, folk music performer
 Richard Fariña, American author and folk music performer

See also
 
 
 Pininfarina (disambiguation)

Italian-language surnames